Events from the year 1709 in Denmark.

Incumbents
 Monarch – Frederick IV
 Grand Chancellor – Christian Christophersen Sehested

Events

 28 June  The Treaty of Dresden ewnews the alliance between Denmark-Norway and Augustus II the Strong against Sweden.
 22 October – The Treaty of Copenhagen renews the alliance between the Russian Empire and Denmark-Norway after it had been destroyed in 1700 with the Peace of Travendal. Denmark-Norway re-enters the Great Northern War as a result.

Births
 16 August – Ludvig Harboe, theologian and bishop (died 1783)
 24 September  Christiane Henriette Louise Juel, courtier (doed 1867)

Full date missing
 Johann Gottfried Rosenberg, architect (died 1776)
 Johan Christian Conradi, architect (died 1779)

Deaths
 14 September  Christian Frederik Bielke, military officer (born 1670)
 17 October – Vibeke Jensdatter, merchant (born 1638)

Publication
 Lex Regia

References

 
1700s in Denmark
Denmark
Years of the 18th century in Denmark